Hang On Little Tomato is the second studio album by American band Pink Martini, released on October 19, 2004, by their own record label, Heinz Records. It has been certified gold in France, Canada, Greece, and Turkey. It was then certified double platinum in France by the UPFI in 2013. In 2014, it was awarded a platinum certification from the Independent Music Companies Association, denoting sales in excess of 400,000 copies across Europe. As of October 2013, it had sold 750,000 copies worldwide.

Overview

As a change from their first album, Pink Martini's second album Hang On Little Tomato features mostly original songs written by band members, and sung in six different languages (French, Italian, Japanese, Croatian, Spanish and English).

The song title is a reference to the Hunt's Ketchup ad campaign "Hang On, Little Tomato!" in a 1964 issue of Life magazine.

Track listing
All lyrics and music by China Forbes and Thomas M. Lauderdale, except where noted.

 The 2004 Audiogram Canada CD release contains the bonus track "Sympathique (Version Inédite)" (Forbes/Lauderdale) - 03:32

Personnel

 China Forbes, Vocals
 Robert Taylor, Trombone, Trumpet
 Dan Faehnle, Guitar, Mandolin
 Maureen Love, Harp
 Brian Davis, Percussion, Conga, Tamborim
 Derek Rieth, Percussion, Bongos, Caxixi, Surdo, Shekere
 Gavin Bondy, Trumpet
 Thomas Lauderdale, Piano
 Timothy Nishimoto, Vocals
 Martín Zarzar, Percussion, Drums, Timbales
 Phil Baker, Bass Upright
 Timothy Jensen, Sax Baritone
 Michael Spiro, Conga
 Osao Murata, Organ
 Kazunori Asano, Acoustic Guitar, Ukulele
 Douglas Edwards Smith, Percussion, Timbales, Pandeiro, Vibraphone, Guiro
 Masumi Timson, Koto
 Hiroshi Wada, Slide Guitar
 Norman Leyden, Clarinet
 John Wager, Bass Upright
 Doug Peebles, Trombone
 Jason Stronquist, Trombone
 Julie Coleman, Violin
 Paloma Griffin, Violin
 Denise Huizenga, Violin
 Joel Belgique, Viola
 Mara Lise Gearman, Viola
 Tyler Neist, Viola
 Charles Noble, Viola
 Oreet Ranon, Cello
 Heather Blackburn, Cello
 Pansy Chang, Cello
 Phil Hansen, Cello
 Timothy Scott, Cello
 Dieter Ratzlaf, Cello

Charts

Weekly charts

Year-end charts

Certifications

References

External links
 Hang On Little Tomato – official album page, with audio samples
 Life magazine ad after which the album was named

2004 albums
Heinz Records albums
Pink Martini albums